Ana Cláudia da Costa Gonçalves (born January 3, 1993) is an Angolan basketball player. At the 2012 Summer Olympics, she competed for the Angola women's national basketball team in the women's event. She is 6 ft 0 inches tall.

References

External links
 

1993 births
Living people
People from Benguela
Angolan women's basketball players
Olympic basketball players of Angola
Basketball players at the 2012 Summer Olympics
C.D. Primeiro de Agosto women's basketball players
Power forwards (basketball)
African Games bronze medalists for Angola
African Games medalists in basketball
Competitors at the 2015 African Games